Mick Snel (born 13 April 1993) is a Dutch korfball player. He currently plays for TOP and made his entry at the Dutch national team at the 2011 Korfball World Championship where he played 5 matches.

In his inaugural 2010-11 season of the Dutch Korfballeague his team TOP became champions and he scored 137 goals making him number 2 on the topscorer list.

Honours
 Champion Dutch Korfballeague 2010-11,  2013–14, 2015-16, 2016-17 and 2017-18 with TOP
 World champion with the Dutch national team 2011 and 2015
 European champion with the Dutch national team 2014 and 2016

References

1993 births
Living people
World Games gold medalists
Competitors at the 2013 World Games
Dutch korfballers
20th-century Dutch people
21st-century Dutch people